Asier Riesgo Unamuno (born 6 October 1983) is a Spanish professional footballer who plays for CD Leganés as a goalkeeper.

Club career
Born in Deba, Gipuzkoa, and a product of Real Sociedad's youth academy, Riesgo made his professional debut with neighbouring SD Eibar in the Segunda División, where he would play for one and a half seasons. In March 2004, he was recalled from his loan due to an injury to first-choice Sander Westerveld.

After Westerveld was waived in the summer, Riesgo became a starter for the Basques, making his La Liga debut on 29 August 2004 in a 1–1 home draw against Levante UD. From the 2006–07 campaign onwards he battled with newly signed Claudio Bravo for starting duties; with the Chilean as the first choice, Real were relegated.

In 2007–08, however, Riesgo played all 42 league matches, although the team did not achieve a top-flight return. In August 2008 he was loaned to Recreativo de Huelva for €350.000, with the club having the option to make the move permanent afterwards for €4.3 million and not having to pay the player's wages.

An undisputed starter throughout the season, Riesgo stopped two penalty kicks on 4 January 2009, helping league strugglers Recre beat CD Numancia 3–1 at home. On 11 April he became the first to ever deny Lionel Messi a penalty, clawing the Argentine's effort out of the air as he saw his side bow down to a 2–0 defeat at FC Barcelona; the Andalusians eventually dropped down a level, with him appearing in all 38 fixtures.

Riesgo served a trial at Premier League side Tottenham Hotspur in December 2009, as potential cover for injured Carlo Cudicini, lost for the campaign after a motorcycle accident. Upon his return, he found himself third choice at Real Sociedad behind Bravo and Eñaut Zubikarai, totalling only 630 minutes of play as they returned to the top tier after three years.

On 18 June 2010, Riesgo – whose contract with Real Sociedad had expired – signed for Navarrese neighbours CA Osasuna for three years. He acted solely as backup during his tenure with the club, first to Ricardo then Andrés Fernández.

Riesgo returned to Eibar in the 2015 off-season after agreeing to a one-year deal, as the team was now in the top flight. On 2 September 2019, he joined second level's Girona FC for one year as a replacement for Sevilla FC-bound Bono.

On 8 September 2020, Riesgo signed a one-year contract with CD Leganés, recently relegated to the second division.

Honours
Real Sociedad
Segunda División: 2009–10

Spain U19
UEFA European Under-19 Championship: 2002

Spain U20
FIFA U-20 World Cup runner-up: 2003

References

External links

1983 births
Living people
People from Debabarrena
Spanish footballers
Footballers from the Basque Country (autonomous community)
Association football goalkeepers
La Liga players
Segunda División players
Segunda División B players
Real Sociedad B footballers
Real Sociedad footballers
SD Eibar footballers
Recreativo de Huelva players
CA Osasuna players
Girona FC players
CD Leganés players
Spain youth international footballers
Spain under-21 international footballers
Basque Country international footballers